Israel Shtime ('Israel Voice') was a Yiddish language newspaper published from Tel Aviv. It was an organ of the Mapam party. David Shtokfish was the founder of the newspaper, and served as its editor until the end. Initially it was a weekly newspaper, but was converted into a fortnightly and later into a monthly publication. Israel Shtime was closed down in October 1997, after 41 years of publishing.

References

1997 disestablishments in Israel
Defunct newspapers published in Israel
Defunct weekly newspapers
Labor Zionism
Mass media in Tel Aviv
Weekly newspapers published in Israel
Non-Hebrew-language newspapers published in Israel
Publications disestablished in 1997
Yiddish culture in Tel Aviv
Yiddish newspapers